is a railway line owned by West Japan Railway Company (JR West) between Aioi, Hyōgo to Okayama, Okayama in Japan. A loop line off the Sanyō Main Line, the Akō Line commences at Aioi, is situated south of the main line approximately paralleling the Seto Inland Sea, and rejoins the main line at Higashi-Okayama.

The entire  line is single track. Only one train runs the entire length of the line, with service divided at Banshū-Akō, and no trains terminate at either of the official terminals. Trains from the east continue from Himeji on the Sanyō Main Line and terminate at Akō, while westbound services originating from Akō continue past Higashi-Okayama and continue on the Sanyō Main Line to Okayama and beyond. "Rapid" and "Special Rapid" trains from Kyoto and beyond make local stops between Aioi and Banshū-Akō, and the segment of the line is part of JR West's Kinki region Urban Network.

Stations
The line is split into two sections at Banshū-Akō Station, where passengers would have to interchange for train services to/from the Keihanshin region and the Okayama region.

History

The initial section between Aioi and Banshu-Ako opened in 1951, and the line was opened progressively, to Hinase in 1955, Inbe in 1958, and Higashi-Okayama in 1962. The Aioi - Banshu-Ako section was electrified in 1961, and the rest of the line in 1969.

CTC signalling was commissioned between Higashi-Okayama and Banshu-Ako in 1983.

Former connecting lines
 Banshu-Ako Station: The Ako Railway operated a   gauge line to Une on the Sanyo Main Line between 1921 and 1951.
 Nishi-Katakami Station: The Dowa Mining Co. opened a  line to Yanahara, to haul iron sulphide ore, between 1923 and 1931. The line is also connected to Wake station on the Sanyo Main Line. Passenger services commenced in 1931, freight services ceased in 1988 and the line closed in 1991.

See also
Main line alternate routes
Gotemba Line
Kure Line
Ube Line

References
This article incorporates material from the corresponding article in the Japanese Wikipedia.

Rail transport in Hyōgo Prefecture
Lines of West Japan Railway Company
1067 mm gauge railways in Japan
Railway lines opened in 1951